In Search of the Sacred: A Conversation with Seyyed Hossein Nasr on His Life and Thought is a 2010 book about the life and thought of the Iranian philosopher Seyyed Hossein Nasr.

References

Sources
 
 
 

Seyyed Hossein Nasr